Arnold is an unincorporated community in Carroll County, Illinois, United States. Arnold is located along the Mississippi River northwest of Savanna.

References

Unincorporated communities in Carroll County, Illinois
Unincorporated communities in Illinois
Illinois populated places on the Mississippi River